Otto Benzon (17 January 1856 – 16 May 1927) was a Danish writer and poet, remembered outside of his country as the lyricist of a dozen or so art songs by Edvard Grieg.

Publications
 A Regular scandal (1886, drama)
 Sportsmænd (1891, drama)
 Anna Bryde (1894, drama)
 Surrogater (1896, drama)
 Moderate Løjer (1900, drama)
 Tilfældigheder (1905, drama)
 En Skandale (1906)
 Forældre (1907)
 Provisorisk (1907)
 Frie Hænder (1908)
 Foraar og Efteraar (1914, drama)

External links
Texts of lyrics at Lieder.net

Danish male poets
1856 births
1927 deaths